The Malaysia Bill is an annex of the Agreement relating to Malaysia between United Kingdom of Great Britain and Northern Ireland, Federation of Malaya, North Borneo, Sarawak and Singapore. It gave effect to the Agreement where that the British colonies of North Borneo, Sarawak and the State of Singapore should be federated with the existing States of the Federation of Malaya and the name of the federation should be Malaysia, and the Federal constitution wherewith to amend and adopt the Constitution of the Federation of Malaya so as to provide for the admission of those States. it adopted its present name, the name of the Constitution of the Federation of Malaya should be changed into Constitution of Malaysia.

Documents

The following is table of contents to the Malaysia Bill.

Part I Preliminary
Part II The States of the Federation
Part III General Constitutional Arrangements
Title I General Provisions as to Federal and State Institutions
 Chapter 1—Preliminary
 Chapter 2—Heads of State
 Chapter 3—Parliament, Legislative Assemblies and State Constitutions
 Chapter 4—The Judiciary
 Title II Citizenship
 Chapter 1—Citizenship by operation of law
 Chapter 2—Citizenship by registration or naturalisation, and transfer to or from Singapore
 Chapter 3—Miscellaneous
 Title III Legislative Powers and Administrative Arrangements
 Title IV Financial Provisions
 Chapter 1—Borneo States
 Chapter 2—Singapore
 Chapter 3—General
 Title V Public Services
 Title VI Protection of Special Interests
 Chapter 1—General
 Chapter 2—Borneo States
 Chapter 3—Singapore
 Title VII Supplementary
 Part IV Transitional and Temporary
 Chapter 1—General
 Chapter 2—State officers
 Chapter 3—The courts and the judiciary
 Chapter 4—Parliament and Legislative Assemblies

Schedules

First delimitation of constituencies
 First Schedule Insertion of new Articles in Constitution
 Second Schedule Section added to Eighth Schedule to Constitution
 Third Schedule—Citizenship (amendment of Second Schedule to Constitution)
 Fourth Schedule—Special Legislative Lists for Borneo States and Singapore
 Fifth Schedule—Additions for Borneo States to Tenth Schedule (Grants and assigned revenues) to Constitution
 Sixth Schedule—Minor and consequential amendments of Constitution

Definitions

For the purpose of the federal and state institutions,
 "Attorney-General" means the Attorney-General of the Federation
 "Chief minister" and "Mentri Besar" both mean the president, by whatever style known, of the executive council in a state (and in particular "chief minister" includes the prime minister in Singapore)
 "Executive Council" means the Cabinet or other body, however called, which in the government of a State corresponds, whether or not the members of it are Ministers, to the Cabinet of Ministers in the government of the Federation (and in particular includes the Supreme Council in Sarawak)
 "Governor" means the Head of State, by whatever style known, in a State not having a Ruler (and in particular includes the Yang di-Pertua Negara in North Borneo and the Yang di-Pertuan Negara in Singapore)
 "Legislative Assembly" means the representative assembly, however called, in the Legislature of a State (and in particular includes the Council Negri in Sarawak), but except in the Eighth Schedule includes also a Legislative Council, however called

States of the federation

Part II enshrines name and number of the basic States of the federation
 The name of the federation shall be known, in Malay and in English, by the name Malaysia.
 The States of the Federation shall be—
 the States of Malaya, namely, Johor, Kedah, Kelantan, Malacca, Negeri Sembilan, Pahang, Penang, Perak, Perlis, Selangor and Terengganu; and
 the Borneo States, namely, North Borneo and Sarawak; and
 the State of Singapore.

The Heads of State

The Chapter 2 of the General Constitutional Arrangements provides that the Governors of North Borneo, Sarawak and Singapore shall be members of the Conference of Rulers. Its main responsibility is the election of the Yang di-Pertuan Agong except for those purposes for which the Governors of Malacca and Penang are not members and became substituted the words "States not having a Ruler".

See also

 Constitution of Malaysia
 Malaysia Agreement was signed on 9 July 1963 at London
 Malaysia Act 1963

References

External links
 Agreement Relating to Malaysia between Governments of United Kingdom, Malaya, North Borneo, Sarawak and Singapore
 Hansard of Parliament of the United Kingdom Malaysia Bill

Formation of Malaysia
History of Malaysia
1963 establishments in Malaysia
United Kingdom Acts of Parliament 1963
1963 in Malaysia
Malaysia–United Kingdom relations
History of North Borneo
History of Sarawak
History of Sabah
History of Singapore
Malaysia and the Commonwealth of Nations
Singapore and the Commonwealth of Nations
United Kingdom and the Commonwealth of Nations